Diamond: Greatest Hits 2002-2010 is the first official greatest hits album by Filipino singer Nina. It was released in the Philippines on October 13, 2010 by Warner Music Philippines; at the time, she had already left the label. The tracks are arranged nearly in a chronological order. Disc 1 is primarily a collection of Nina's hits from 2002 to 2004 (with some non-album songs from 2005 to 2007), while Disc 2 is primarily a collection of her hits from 2005 to 2010.

Content
Diamond: Greatest Hits 2002-2010 is considered to be Nina's first ever official greatest hits compilation, since Best of Nina (2009) was exclusively released only in South Korea, and did not have any promotion and participation from the singer. In mid-2010, she left the Warner Music Philippines record label and moved to Universal Records. Therefore, she had no contribution and creative input on the production of the album. Also, she was not in control on the contractual agreement of the album. It is clear that she had no participation on the album, since there is no personal message from the singer that can be seen in the album's liner notes. There wasn't even a new song included, just previous releases, and the single "Love Will Lead You Back" was only taken from Nina Sings the Hits of Diane Warren (2008).

The album consists of her commercial singles from her 2002 debut album to her 2009 album, which was taken from her radio show of the same name. It also includes some of her notable songs, all arranged almost in a chronological order. Disc 1 consists of songs from Heaven (2002) and Smile (2003), with some of her non-album releases. Disc 2 includes singles from the box-office Nina Live! (2005) to Renditions of the Soul (2009). The non-singles and non-album tracks are:
 "Kung Ibibigay Sa'yo" (2002), "Smile" (2003) and "The Closer I Get to You" (2005), which all received notable radio airplay.
 the movie soundtracks "What If" (2004), "I'll Always Love You" (2006) and "Collide" (2007).
 the promotional singles "Shoo-Bee-Doo" (2003), "I'll Always Stay in Love This Way" (2003), "Love Is Contagious" (2006) and "Saving Forever for You" (2008).
 "2nd Floor" (2002), "Burn" (2006) and "I Didn't Mean to Make You Mine" (2006).
 the duet with American singer Joe Pizzulo, "I'm Never Gonna Give You Up" (2005).

Artwork
The album is a box set, containing four discs—two CDs containing her greatest hits, a minus one (instrumental) CD of her songs, and a DVD containing twenty-three of her official music videos. The album is in a 12"×12" packaging, made of cardboard. The cover has a platinum lettering of the album's title, on which the letter "i" on "Nina" has an unauthentic gem. The album has a unique inlay—on which it is composed of rare photos of Nina, printed on three layers and designed in a diorama format. It also includes a booklet with songwriting credits, lyrics and discography.

The album cover is printed with a big butterfly, which is Nina's favorite insect-figure and symbol. Earlier in her career, she expressed her interest in butterflies, saying "I love butterflies because they're so feminine, something created for us girls only. It was in high school when I started collecting preserved butterflies and until now whenever I see anything with a butterfly I buy it."

Singles
"Love Will Lead You Back", a song originally released by Taylor Dayne, was released as the only single from the album. It was taken from Nina's 2008 album, Nina Sings the Hits of Diane Warren. It received heavy airplay on TV and radio stations in September 2010. During its release, it was rumored to be the farewell video of Warner for Nina. As soon as the album was out, it became clear that the song is the first single of the album. The music video for "Love Will Lead You Back" is a collection of almost all the music videos Nina has recorded under Warner.

Reception
Baby A. Gil of The Philippine Star listed Diamond: Greatest Hits 2002-2010 on top of her list of albums to buy on Christmas. She described the album packaging as "a big box that resembles the LP jackets." She added "This is the big treat for fans of soul siren Nina or for anybody who likes his sound sweet and soothing, and performed by a pretty girl."

On the 24th Awit Awards in 2011, Nina was nominated for two categories, in which one is for the album. Diamond: Greatest Hits 2002-2010 was nominated for Best Album Package.

Track listing
All tracks were produced by Neil Gregorio.

Personnel
 Jim Baluyut - executive producer
 Joseph De Vera - album art layout
 Neil Gregorio - producer
 Anne Poblador - album design concept

Release history

References

Nina Girado albums
2010 greatest hits albums